Salvia orthostachys is a perennial shrub endemic to Colombia, growing in dry country on roadsides, rocky banks, and stony bushland.

Notes

orthostachys
Endemic flora of Colombia